The Central Command of the Arab Socialist Ba'ath Party, which was established through the merger of the National Command of the Arab Socialist Ba'ath Party and the Regional Command of the Syrian Regional Branch of the Arab Socialist Ba'ath Party in 2018, is the ruling organ of the Ba'ath Party organization in Syria and the Syrian-led Ba'athist movement. Its former, Regional Command, stems from Ba'athist ideology, where region literally means an Arab state. According to the Syrian Constitution, the Central Command has the power to nominate a candidate for president. While the constitution does not state that the Secretary-General of the Central Command is the President of Syria, the charter of the  National Progressive Front (NPF), of which the Ba'ath Party is a member, states that the President and the Secretary-General is the NPF President, but this is not stated in any legal document. The 1st Extraordinary Regional Congress held in 1964 decided that the Secretary-General of the Central Command would also be head of state. Amin al-Hafiz, the incumbent secretary, became head of state and retained his post as Prime Minister.

At the 2nd Regional Congress in 1965, the Military Committee weakened the powers of the National Command by passing a resolution that the Regional Secretary of the Regional Command was ex officio head of state. The secretariat was given the powers to appoint the Prime Minister, the cabinet, the commander-in-chief and the leading military commanders.(). Before the 1970 Corrective Revolution that brought Hafez al-Assad to power, the local party leadership was elected by fellow Ba'ath Party members; when al-Assad came to power the Central Command began to appoint all party officials. Under Bashar al-Assad this policy was reversed, and party members were again able to elect the local party leadership, but candidates had to be approved by the party leadership.

The Central Command is officially responsible to the Regional Congress. The Central Command is supposed to be subordinate to the National Command, and official media portray it as such to stress the government's commitment to Ba'athist ideology. Since Hafez al-Assad's rise to power, the National Command has been subordinate to the Central Command. Before the schism between the Military Committee led by Salah Jadid and the Aflaqites, and the ensuing 1966 Syrian coup d'état, the National Command was the leading party organ. The Central  Command is today the most powerful institution in Syria.

The Secretary-General chairs all the meetings of the Central Command. If the Secretary-General is absent, the Assistant Secretary-General substitutes him. The Assistant Secretary-General sets the agenda for the meeting, with consultation of the Secretary-General. Under Bashar al-Assad a degree of openness is permitted in Central Command meetings. Members are allowed to discuss each sides of complex issues and members can criticize certain policies and how they are implemented. However, if Bashar al-Assad supports a side, that side will prevail in the argument. In contrast to his father, Hafez, who consulted with the Central Command and took their views into account before he made a decision, the Central Command under Bashar al-Assad is increasingly becoming a rubber stamp body.

Heads and bureaus

Regional Secretary of the Regional Command
 Hammud al-Shufi (5 September 1963 – 1 February 1964)
 Shibli Aysami (5 February 1964 – 4 October 1964)
 Amin al-Hafiz (4 October 1964 – 19 December 1965)
 Regional Command dissolved (19 December 1965 – 27 March 1966)
 Nureddin al-Atassi (27 March 1966 – 13 November 1970)
 Hafez al-Assad (18 November 1970 – 10 June 2000)
 Bashar al-Assad (24 June 2000 – October 2018)
Secretary-General of the Central Command
 Bashar al-Assad (October 2018 – present)

Assistant Regional Secretary of the Regional Command
 Fahmu al-Ashuri (1 February 1964 – 17 March 1965)
 Muhammad az-Zubi (17 March – 1 August 1965)
 Salah Jadid (1 August 1965 – 13 November 1970)
 Mohamad Jaber Bajbouj (18 November 1970 – 7 January 1980)
 Zuhair Masharqa (7 January 1980 – 20 January 1985)
 Sulayman Qaddah (20 January 1985 – 9 June 2005)
 Mohammed Saeed Bekheitan (9 June 2005 – 8 July 2013)
 Hilal Hilal (10 July 2013 – October 2018)
Assistant Secretary-General of the Central Command
 Hilal Hilal (October 2018 – present)

Bureaus of the Central Command
 Bureau of the Secretariat
 National Security Bureau
 Organization Bureau
 Preparation Bureau
 Military Bureau (also known as the "Military Committee")
 Bureau of Education and Scouts
 Bureau of Peasants
 Finance Bureau
 Legal Bureau
 National Economy Bureau
 Bureau of Students
 Bureau of Youth and Sport
 Bureau of High Education and Scientific Research
 Bureau of Professional
 Bureau of Workers

Members
Only members who were elected to the Regional Command at the 1st Regional Congress (held in September 1963) and after are included in this list. The Syrian Regional Branch was dissolved in 1958 (and is therefore considered as a distinct entity by the Syrian Regional Branch itself) so that Syria, with Egypt, could establish the United Arab Republic. The Syrian Regional Branch was officially reestablished in September 1963.

References

Bibliography

Journals and papers

Books
 
 
 
 
 
 

.1
Organizations established in 1963
Executive committees of political parties
1963 establishments in Syria